Rokeya Prachy is a Bangladeshi theater, television and film actress and director.

Career
Prachy got her acting breakthrough in Morshedul Islam's film Dukhai in 1997. Her first directorial work was a docufiction for Channel I in 2009. She later directed "Lutfunnesa" and "Bayanno'r Michhile". In 2015, she made her first television series direction in "Shelai Poribar".

Personal life
Prachy was married to Sergeant Ahad Parvez. He was killed by muggers in Shapla Square, Motijheel in Dhaka on 28 October 1999. She then married journalist and columnist Asif Nazrul in May  2004. They have a daughter together. The marriage ended up in divorce by 2013.

Works

Television dramas
 Share Bahattor Ghonta (2016)
 Shelai Poribar (2015)
 Parampara (2015)
 Tobuo Manush Swopno Dekhe (2015)

Films

Awards and nominations 

Prachy was nominated for and won domestic and international awards.

References

External links 
 
 
 Rokeya Prachy at Turner Classic Movies
 Rokeya Prachy at MUBI

Living people
Bangladeshi television actresses
Bangladeshi film actresses
Bangladeshi stage actresses
Best Supporting Actress National Film Award (Bangladesh) winners
Best TV Actress Meril-Prothom Alo Critics Choice Award winners
Year of birth missing (living people)
Place of birth missing (living people)